The Gruesome Twosome is a 1967 American splatter comedy film, produced and directed by Herschell Gordon Lewis.

Synopsis 

Mrs. Pringle (Elizabeth Davis) owns a wig shop in a little town in Florida, but she is a demented woman who lives with her mentally disabled son, Rodney (Chris Martell), in a home where she rents rooms to young co-eds attending the local university. Girls are disappearing; they are killed and scalped by a mysterious murderer. When Kathy, a co-ed attending the university nearby, tries to figure out who is killing her classmates, the police discover the terrible truth about the fate of the young victims. And the truth, of course, involves Mrs. Pringle and her son.

Cast 

 Elizabeth Davis as Mrs. Pringle
 Gretchen Wells as Kathy Baker
 Chris Martell as Rodney Pringle
 Rodney Bedell as Dave Hall
 Ronnie Cass as Nancy Harris
 Karl Stoeber as Mr. Spinsen
 Dianne Wilhite as Janet
 Andrea Barr as Susan
 Dianne Raymond as Dawn Farrell
 Sherry Robinson as Lisa
 Barrie Walton as Neighbor Lady
 Marcelle Bichette as Jane
 Tom Brent as Neighbor Man
 Mike Todd as Mike

See also
List of American films of 1967

External links
 
 
 
 Film4 review

1967 films
1967 horror films
1960s comedy horror films
Films directed by Herschell Gordon Lewis
American splatter films
American comedy horror films
Films set in Florida
1967 comedy films
1960s exploitation films
1960s English-language films
1960s American films